Ramón Jaime Martínez (born March 22, 1968) is a former pitcher in Major League Baseball.  He won 135 games over a 13-year career, mostly with the Los Angeles Dodgers. He is the older brother of Hall of Fame pitcher Pedro Martínez, and is currently a senior advisor in Latin America for the Baltimore Orioles.

Baseball career

Los Angeles Dodgers
Martínez was signed by the Los Angeles Dodgers as an amateur free agent on September 1, 1984, and was the youngest player in the National League when he made his major league debut on August 13, 1988, against the San Francisco Giants. He allowed only one run on four hits in  innings in a game the Dodgers eventually won in 11 innings. He got his first career win on August 29 against the Montreal Expos. That season, he won his first and only World Series ring with the 1988 Los Angeles Dodgers.

He had a breakout season in 1990, when he won 20 games, struck out 18 batters in a game (on June 4), was selected an All-Star, led the major leagues with 12 complete games, and finished second in strikeouts as well as in the Cy Young Award balloting.  He remained a solid pitcher for several years, winning 17 games in 1991 and 1995. On July 14 of the latter year, Martínez no-hit the Florida Marlins 7-0 at Dodger Stadium. In his no-hitter, the only thing that kept him from a perfect game was a walk to Tommy Gregg with two outs in the 8th inning.

Early in the 1998 season, Martínez suffered a torn rotator cuff and torn cartilage, which was surgically repaired on June 30. The Dodgers did not pick up a $5.6 million option after 1998 and he signed with the Boston Red Sox.

In 11 seasons with the Dodgers, he was 123-77 with a 3.45 ERA and 1,314 strikeouts and was the team's opening day starter five times.

Later career
Ramón started the 1999 season in the minor leagues for rehabilitation. He was called up by the Red Sox in August, to pitch again alongside brother Pedro, making four starts for a 3-1 record with an ERA of 3.05. Martinez was less successful in 2000, with a record of 10-8 and a 6.03 ERA, and his option for 2001 was not picked up by the Red Sox.

After his two years with the Red Sox, he signed again with the Dodgers, but they released him at the end of spring training.  He played briefly with the Pittsburgh Pirates in 2001 before retiring.

Family
Ramón has three brothers, Pedro, Nelson and Jesus.

While he was a starter for the Dodgers, Ramón repeatedly asserted that Pedro was an even better pitcher than he was.  Nevertheless, Dodgers management thought Pedro was too small to be successful and traded him away.  Pedro went on to win three Cy Young Awards with the Expos and Red Sox, and was a first-ballot inductee to the Hall of Fame in 2015. Ramón and Pedro were eventually reunited as teammates during Ramón's two years with the Red Sox.

His youngest brother, Jesus, also played professional baseball in the Dodgers farm system. He was briefly called up to the Majors in September 1996 but never got into a game.

See also

 List of Major League Baseball single-game strikeout leaders
 List of Major League Baseball no-hitters

References

External links

1968 births
Living people
Albuquerque Dukes players
Bakersfield Dodgers players
Boston Red Sox players
Dominican Republic expatriate baseball players in the United States
Gulf Coast Dodgers players
Gulf Coast Red Sox players

Los Angeles Dodgers players
Lowell Spinners players
Major League Baseball pitchers
Major League Baseball players from the Dominican Republic
National League All-Stars
Pawtucket Red Sox players
Pittsburgh Pirates players
San Antonio Missions players
San Bernardino Stampede players
Sarasota Red Sox players
Vero Beach Dodgers players